Ieva is a Latvian and Lithuanian given name, counterpart of English Eve, derived from a Hebrew name meaning "life" or "living one". It can also mean full of life or mother of life. It is the standard biblical form of Eve in many European languages.

People
Ieva Adomavičiūtė (born 1994), Lithuanian rower 
Ieva Andrejevaitė (born 1988), Lithuanian actress
Ieva Budraitė (born 1992), Lithuanian politician, green leader
Ieva Gaile (born 1997), Latvian figure skater
Ieva Ilves (born 1977), Latvian diplomat and former First Lady of Estonia
Ieva Kokoreviča (born 1985), Latvian former beauty pageant contestant
Ieva Krusta (born 1976), Latvian curler 
Ieva Kubliņa (born 1982), Latvian basketball player 
Ieva Lagūna (born 1990), Latvian model
Ieva Narkutė (born 1987), Lithuanian singer-songwriter 
Ieva Pulvere (born 1990), Latvian basketball player 
Ieva Sargautytė (born 1981), Lithuanian orienteering competitor
Ieva Simonaitytė (1897–1978), Lithuanian writer 
Ieva Tāre (born 1974), Latvian basketball player
Ieva Zasimauskaitė (born 1993), Lithuanian singer 
Ieva Zunda (born 1978), Latvian athlete

See also
 

Latvian feminine given names
Lithuanian feminine given names